Chileranthemum is a genus of flowering plants belonging to the family Acanthaceae.

Its native range is Mexico to El Salvador.

Species:

Chileranthemum lottiae 
Chileranthemum pyramidatum 
Chileranthemum trifidum

References

Acanthaceae
Acanthaceae genera